Cosmopterix dulcivora is a moth of the family Cosmopterigidae. It is known from China (Jiangxi), Japan, Russia, Fiji, Samoa, the Philippines (Negros), Java and Queensland, Australia.

The length of the forewings is about 5 mm.

The larvae have been recorded feeding on Poaceae species, including Miscanthus sinensis in Japan and Saccharum officinarum in Fiji, the Philippines and Queensland.

References

dulcivora
Moths of Japan